Francesca Lo Schiavo (born 11 January 1948) is an Italian set decorator.

Married to fellow art director and co-collaborator Dante Ferretti, she bas been nominated for  the Academy Award for Best Art Direction eight times, winning three of them. The movies which she has been nominated for are:

The Adventures of Baron Munchausen (1989), Nominated.
Hamlet (1990), Nominated.
Interview with the Vampire (1994), Nominated.
Kundun (1997), Nominated.
Gangs of New York (2002), Nominated.
The Aviator (2004), Won.
Sweeney Todd: The Demon Barber of Fleet Street (2007), Won.
Hugo (2011), Won.

References

1948 births
Living people
Best Art Direction Academy Award winners
Best Production Design BAFTA Award winners
Ciak d'oro winners
Italian set decorators